Bahira Abdulatif Yasin is an Iraqi writer, translator and professor living in Madrid.

She's an associate professor at Autonomous University of Madrid's Arabic and Islamic Studies department. An expert in Spanish philology, Abdulatif has also served in the Faculty of Languages at the University of Baghdad. She came to Madrid after United Nations imposed Sanctions against Iraq following its invasion of Kuwait in 1990. She has also taught at Complutense University of Madrid, University of Salamanca and written fictional works in Arabic.

Abdulatif won an award for her translation of Rafael Alberti's works in the Arabic language beside those of Jorge Luis Borges, José Carlos Mainer and José Antonio Maravall. She has also translated Cuerpo adentro, Ana Silva's first collection of poems into Arabic. In 2003, ?Lapidación? : mujer árabe, Islam y sociedad, a book she co-authored was published.

Abdulatif feels that before the US-led 2003 Invasion of Iraq, the country was more secular and among the Arab nations had "one of the most advanced legislation".

References

1957 births
Living people
Writers from Baghdad
University of Baghdad alumni
Iraqi translators
Academic staff of the University of Baghdad
Academic staff of the Autonomous University of Madrid
Academic staff of the Complutense University of Madrid
Academic staff of the University of Salamanca
Spanish people of Iraqi descent
Spanish translators
Iraqi women poets
21st-century Spanish writers
21st-century Spanish women writers
20th-century Iraqi writers
20th-century Iraqi women writers
21st-century Iraqi writers
21st-century Iraqi women writers
20th-century Iraqi poets
21st-century Iraqi poets
Spanish Arabic-language poets